Frederick Leslie Bartlett (5 March 1913 – 1968) was an English professional footballer who played in the Football League for Leyton Orient and Queens Park Rangers as a centre half. He made the most appearances of any player for Leyton Orient during the Second World War, with 215.

Career statistics

References

English footballers
English Football League players

1913 births
1968 deaths
Sportspeople from Reading, Berkshire
Association football wing halves
Maidenhead United F.C. players
Queens Park Rangers F.C. players
Club Français players
Ligue 1 players
Expatriate footballers in France
Leyton Orient F.C. players
Gloucester City A.F.C. players
Southern Football League players
English expatriate footballers
Reading F.C. wartime guest players
Norwich City F.C. wartime guest players
Footballers from Berkshire